The Gas (Exempt Supplies) Act 1993 (1993 chapter 1) is an Act of the Parliament of the United Kingdom which amended the prohibition on certain unauthorised gas supplies and amended the duties of the Director General of Gas Supply.

Background 
The Gas Act 1986, which had privatised the British gas industry, had been focussed on large suppliers of gas. The associated bureaucracy and regulation costs were an impediment to smaller suppliers. These included suppliers of LPG (liquified petroleum gas, comprising butane and propane). The Gas (Exempt Supplies) Bill had started as a Private Members Bill in the House of Lords and was intended to remove the prohibition on unauthorised supply of gas from smaller operators.

Gas (Exempt Supplies) Act 1993 
The Gas (Exempt Supplies) Act 1993 received Royal Assent on 19 January 1993. Its long title is ‘An Act to amend section 5 of the Gas Act 1986; and for connected purposes.’

Provisions 
The Act comprises four sections:

 Section 1: Prohibition on unauthorised supply. Removed and replaced Section 5 of the Gas Act 1986. Prohibition not to include suppliers of gas comprising mainly propane and butane.
 Section 2: Exemption from section 5. Added a new section 6A to the 1986 Act. Allowed exemptions if agreed by the Secretary of State for Energy and the Director General of Gas Supply. 
 Section 3: Keeping a register. Exemptions and notifications to be included in a register.
 Section 4: Short title, commencement and extent. Act does not extend to Northern Ireland.

Repeal 
Sections 1 and 2 of this Act were repealed by Section 17 of the Gas Act 1995. Effective from 1 March 1996.

See also 

 Oil and gas industry in the United Kingdom

References 

United Kingdom Acts of Parliament 1993
Natural gas industry in the United Kingdom